James T. Sifers (born January 18, 1983) is an American former professional ice hockey defenseman who played most notably in the American Hockey League (AHL). He enjoyed brief stints in the National Hockey League (NHL) with the Toronto Maple Leafs and Minnesota Wild.

Playing career
Undrafted, Sifers played collegiate hockey with the University of Vermont in the Hockey East prior to making his professional debut at the end of the 2005-06 season with the Toronto Marlies of the AHL.

On March 15, 2006, Sifers signed a two-year entry level contract with the Toronto Maple Leafs. In 2008–09, his third season within the Maple Leafs organization, Sifers would make his NHL debut with Maple Leafs, playing in 23 games while registering 2 assists.

On July 8, 2009, Sifers signed a one-year contract with the Minnesota Wild organization. After making the opening night roster for the Wild to start the 2009–10 season, Sifers played the majority of the year with AHL affiliate, the Houston Aeros. Sifers would play 14 games collectively throughout the season with the Wild.

On July 2, 2010, Sifers signed a one-year contract with the Atlanta Thrashers organization. He was assigned to their AHL affiliate, the Chicago Wolves for the entirety of the 2010–11 season.

On May 26, 2011, Sifers left the NHL and signed a one-year contract with German club, Adler Mannheim of the Deutsche Eishockey Liga.

After three seasons in Germany, Sifers opted to return to North America, signing a one-year deal as a free agent with the Springfield Falcons of the AHL on July 3, 2014. Playing with the affiliate of the Columbus Blue Jackets, Sifers appeared in every game for the Falcons on the blueline, contributing with 22 points in the 2014–15 season. On July 2, 2015, Sifers was signed by the Blue Jackets, to a two-year, two-way contract as a free agent.

Following the completion of his two-year deal with the Blue Jackets, Sifers left the Cleveland Monsters as a free agent. He agreed to continue his career in the AHL, signing a two-year deal with the Utica Comets, an affiliate to the Vancouver Canucks, on July 13, 2017.

Upon the conclusion of his contract with the Comets at the end of the 2018-19 regular season, Sifers opted to conclude his 13 year professional career, announcing his retirement on April 15, 2019.

Career statistics

Awards and honors

References

External links

1983 births
Adler Mannheim players
American men's ice hockey defensemen
Chicago Wolves players
Cleveland Monsters players
Ice hockey players from Connecticut
Houston Aeros (1994–2013) players
Lake Erie Monsters players
Living people
Minnesota Wild players
People from Stratford, Connecticut
Springfield Falcons players
Taft School alumni
Toronto Maple Leafs players
Toronto Marlies players
Undrafted National Hockey League players
Utica Comets players
Vermont Catamounts men's ice hockey players